John O'Brien (May 21, 1960 – April 10, 1994) was an American author. His first novel, Leaving Las Vegas, was published in 1990 by Watermark Press and made into a film of the same name in 1995.

Life and career
O'Brien was born in Oxford, Ohio, where his parents, Bill and Judy O'Brien, were both students at Miami University. He was the brother of writer Erin O'Brien. John grew up in Brecksville and Lakewood, Ohio, and graduated from Lakewood High School in 1978. He married Lisa Kirkwood in 1979, and the couple moved to Los Angeles, California, in 1982. His first novel, Leaving Las Vegas, is dedicated to her.

Through a friend of his ex-wife, O'Brien got a gig writing Episode 37 of the animated series Rugrats, "Toys in the Attic", which premiered in 1992 under his only known pseudonym, Carroll Mine. According to his sister, Erin, he was disgusted with editorial changes made to his script.

Death
O'Brien died from suicide at his Beverly Hills apartment on April 10, 1994, two weeks after learning that his novel, Leaving Las Vegas, was to be made into a movie. His father says that the novel was his suicide note. Two more of his novels were published posthumously: Stripper Lessons (Grove Press, 1997) and The Assault on Tony's (Grove Press, 1996), both of which had been left unfinished at the time of his death and were completed by his sister, Erin.  A third manuscript, Better, was published by Akashic Press in 2009.

Bibliography

References

External links
 
  interview with Erin O'Brien
 
 
 
 
 
 
 

20th-century American novelists
American male novelists
Novelists from Ohio
Suicides by firearm in California
People from Oxford, Ohio
1960 births
1994 deaths
20th-century American male writers
People from Brecksville, Ohio
People from Lakewood, Ohio
1994 suicides